Transmit Disrupt is the second album from Hell Is for Heroes and features 12 tracks. It was released in the United Kingdom in March 2005 while the band wasn't under a record label; consequently the album didn't get a lot of promotion. The singles "Kamichi", "One Of Us", "Discos and Casinos" and "Models for the Programme" were taken from the album. In March 2006 the album was re-released by Burning Heart Records with new artwork and packaging.

Track listing
 "Kamichi" – 3:55
 "Models for the Programme" – 3:59
 "Quiet Riot" – 4:46
 "Folded Paper Figures" – 2:46
 "---vVv---" – 1:06
 "They Will Call Us Savages" – 4:10
 "Silent as the Grave" – 4:30
 "One of Us" – 2:48
 "---wWw---" – 0:50
 "Transmit Disrupt" – 5:58
 "Discos and Casinos" – 3:30
 "Burning Lafayette" – 7:33

References

External links
Album information from Burning Heart Records
Hell Is for Heroes official site

Hell Is for Heroes (band) albums
2005 albums
Burning Heart Records albums